Adela Raimannová was a Czechoslovakian luger who competed during the mid-1930s. She won the silver medal in the women's singles event at the 1934 European luge championships in Ilmenau, Germany.

References
 List of European luge champions 

Czechoslovak female lugers
Year of birth missing
Year of death missing